The James P. Johnson House is a building and property in Thompsons Station, Tennessee, dating from 1854. It has been listed on the National Register of Historic Places since 1988.  It has also been known as Laurel Hill.  It includes Greek Revival and Central passage plan and other architecture.

The house is notable for its association with the Laurel Hill Stock Farm, a famous livestock farm founded in the 1830s by Thomas Johnson, which was later inherited by his son, James P. Johnson, in 1853. During the 1850s the Laurel Hill Stock farm was expanded to over 500 acres and became known as one of the best livestock breeding farms in middle Tennessee.

References

Central-passage houses in Tennessee
Greek Revival houses in Tennessee
Houses completed in 1854
Houses in Williamson County, Tennessee
Houses on the National Register of Historic Places in Tennessee
National Register of Historic Places in Williamson County, Tennessee